Thinking is the first studio album by South Korean rapper and producer Zico. This is the first work from Zico released by his own agency, KOZ Entertainment, and distributed by Kakao M. Thinking is made up of 2 EPs, which were released separately to digital music and streaming platforms. The first EP, Thinking Part.1, was released on September 30, 2019, and the second EP, Thinking Part.2, was released on November 8, 2019. The physical version of the album, with the combined EPs, was released on November 8, 2019.

His first full-length album in eight years, Zico, in an interview said he poured his true emotions into this album. He said, "I guess I’ve been mistreating myself. In the course of feeding 'Zico,' I found out that human 'Woo Ji-ho' [Zico's real name] was worn out, unaware of how to live, how to feel when left alone. I wanted to talk about those feelings in my new album. I always knew that I was struggling from my two distinct identities, but tried to ignore it and brush it off since I didn’t want to accept it. I didn’t want to ruin my character as 'Zico'. So I kept upping the tension, sometimes exaggerating my punky, wild image. I guess it was my way of confirming my self-esteem. But the gap grew wider and my emotions piled up to the point where I couldn’t breathe. So I decided to be honest to myself, show my vulnerability for the first time in my career." He added, “Some of the emotions were frankly some things that I didn't want to face. As 'Zico', there's the bright and energetic side. But as a human being, you have some sides to yourself that you don’t want to show. This is about that.” Thinking Part.1 is about "laying out the different emotions and thoughts people commonly have in their everyday lives", while Thinking Part.2 is more about the "detailed and intricate feelings or reactions that I have of those moments".

Thinking peaked third on the Gaon Music Chart.

Track listing

Charts

Sales

Release history

See also
Zico discography

References 

2019 albums
Korean-language albums